KJFA may refer to:

 KJFA (AM), a radio station (840 AM) licensed to serve Belen, New Mexico, United States
 KJFA-FM, a radio station (102.9 FM) licensed to serve Pecos, New Mexico, United States
 KYLZ (FM), a radio station (101.3 FM) licensed to serve Albuquerque, New Mexico, United States, which held the call sign KJFA from 2002 to 2006 and KJFA-FM from 2015 to 2017
 KKRG-FM, a radio station (105.1 FM) licensed to serve Santa Fe, New Mexico, United States, which held the call sign KJFA from 2006 to 2015
 KLVB, a radio station (99.5 FM) licensed to serve Citrus Heights, California, United States, which held the call sign KJFA from 1989 to 1997